Pratibha Parmar is a British writer and filmmaker. She has made feminist documentaries such as Alice Walker: Beauty in Truth and My Name is Andrea about Andrea Dworkin.

Early life
Parmar w as born in Nairobi, Kenya to Indian parents and her family then moved to the United Kingdom. She received a B.A. from Bradford University and attended Birmingham University for postgraduate studies. Parmar's feminism was influenced by writers such as Angela Davis, June Jordan, Cherrie Moraga, Barbara Smith and Alice Walker.

Career

With her 1991 film Khush, Parmar examined the erotic world of South Asian lesbians and gay men in the United Kingdom and India, using a mix of documentary footage and dramatic scenes. The documentary Alice Walker: Beauty in Truth is about the life of author and activist Alice Walker, who Parmar had first met in 1991 via June Jordan and Angela Davis. Walker and Parmar also collaborated on Warrior Marks, a documentary about female genital mutilation. They then released a book, also entitled Warrior Marks.

In 2022, Parmar released her documentary My Name is Andrea about the second wave feminist and writer Andrea Dworkin.

Parmar has also made music videos for Morcheeba, Tori Amos and Midge Ure.

Awards and recognition

Parmar won the 1993 Frameline Award at the Frameline Film Festival in San Francisco and her films have won various prizes. In 2016, she was listed as one of BBC's 100 Women.

Selected works

Film
 My Name is Andrea (2022)
 Alice Walker: Beauty in Truth (2014)
 Nina's Heavenly Delights (2006)
 A Place of Rage (1991)
 Khush (1991)

Writing

 Pocket Sized Venus in Femmes of Power: Exploding Queer Femininities, Del LaGrace Volcano and Ulrika Dahl. Serpent's Tail, 2008.
 Warrior Marks: Female Genital Mutilation and the Sexual Blinding of Women. Co-author with Alice Walker. Harcourt Brace in the U.S. and Jonathan Cape in the U.K, November 1993.
 Queer Looks: An Anthology of Writings about Lesbian and Gay Media. Co-edited with Martha Gever & John Greyson. Routledge, New York & London, October 1993.
 "Perverse Politics", in Feminist Review, No 34, 1991.
 "Challenging Imperial Feminism with Valerie Amos", in Feminist Review (1984) and reprinted several times in various publications and anthologies including Feminism & Race. Oxford University Press, 2000.

See also 
 List of female film and television directors
 List of lesbian filmmakers
 List of LGBT-related films directed by women

References

Further reading 
 
 Gwendolyn Audrey Foster, Women Filmmakers of the African and Asian Diaspora. Southern Illinois University Press, 1997.
 Looking For The Other. Feminism, Film and the Imperial Gaze. Chapter 6: "Can One Know the Other?” The Ambivalence of Postcolonialism in Chocolat, Warrior Marks, and Mississippi Masala." E. Ann Kaplan. Routledge, 1997.
 Alpana Sharma Knippling, "Self (En)Gendered in Ideology: Pratibha Parmar's Bhangra Jig and Sari Red", in JPCS: Journal for the Psychoanalysis of Culture & Society, Volume 1 (No 2), Fall 1996.
 Film Fatales: Independent Women Directors. Eds. Judith M. Redding & Victoria A. Brownworth. Seal Press, 1997.

External links
 
 Pratibha Parmar at Women Make Movies
 Marjorie Baumgarten, "Two by Pratibha Parmar: A Place of Rage, Khush" (review), The Austin Chronicle, 21 February 1992.
 Louise Carolin, "INTERVIEW/VIDEO: PRATIBHA PARMAR ON HER FILM ABOUT AMERICAN ICON ALICE WALKER", Diva, 19 March 2012.

1955 births
Living people
Activists against female genital mutilation
British documentary film directors
British women film directors
British women film producers
British women screenwriters
English film directors
American lesbian artists
Lesbian feminists
American lesbian writers
LGBT film directors
LGBT producers
American LGBT screenwriters
Women documentary filmmakers
British people of Indian descent
People from Nairobi
Alumni of the University of Bradford
Alumni of the University of Birmingham
BBC 100 Women
21st-century American women writers